Nenjil is a 2006 Indian Tamil-language film directed by Selva and produced by Manish Nair, Bhavani Kanagasapay under the banner Candy Films Ltd & Gatpaham Entertainment Ltd. Navdeep pairs up with Aparna, while Vadivelu plays the comedian in the movie.

Plot
The film is about a group of people who win a competition and are taken to London for a free trip. Thus the beginning appears promising. The group includes hero Anand (Navdeep) and heroine Priya (Aparna). But the joyous journey sours when the lead pair which falls in love at the beginning of the holiday. Enters Rishi (Manish), a tourist guide for London. He resolves to separate the lovers and plans to marry Priya. rest is a cat and mouse game between Anand and Rishi and how their love win all problems. There are also two people who separate him. They have already loved but have been separated and so they hate love. They decide to split them up so that they win the competition against Priya and Anand. In the end they tell them the truth and Priya and Anand reunite.

Cast

Navdeep as Anand
Aparna as Priya
Manish Nair as Rishi
Thalaivasal Vijay as Krishnamurthy
Ranjitha as Kalyani
Vadivelu as Vellam (Tamilman)/ Englishman
Paravai Muniyamma as Paatti
Mayilsamy as Vellam's assistant
Singamuthu
Thambi Ramaiah
Sibiraj as himself (cameo appearance)
D. Imman as cameo appearance in song "Nenjil"

Production
A press meet for the film was held in July 2006 in Chennai. A nine-year-old, Siddharth, entered the Limca Book of Records as the youngest musician to record for the film with his drums.

The film was briefly referred to as Nenjil Jil Jil after the State government announcing entertainment tax exemption on movies titled in Tamil, but was later released without the Jil Jil suffix. Scenes for the film were shot at Woolacombe in Devon in March 2006 with the 30-strong cast and crew will also be visiting Weymouth, Bath and London.

Soundtrack
Soundtrack is composed by D. Imman. The album was released under the title Nenjil.. Jil... Jil....

Critical reception
Sify wrote:"Watching Nenjil makes you think- What a waste of time!". The Hindu wrote:"Nenjil is laughable in patches you could say, but the romantic thread is so common and run of the mill that it pulls down the interest quotient terribly".

References

External links

2006 films
2000s Tamil-language films
2006 romantic drama films
Indian romantic drama films
Films set in London
Films shot in London
Films scored by D. Imman
Films directed by Selva (director)